Jerrika Hinton is an American actress, best known for her role as Stephanie Edwards in the ABC medical drama series Grey's Anatomy.

Early life
Hinton was born and raised in Oak Cliff, Dallas, Texas, the daughter of Cynthia, a retired government worker, and Avaleon Hinton.

She graduated in 2002 with honors from Southern Methodist University's Meadows School of the Arts with a Bachelor of Fine Arts degree in theatre, studying directing and playwriting.

Career
Hinton began her career appearing in stage productions. She has made her film debut in the 2006 independent drama Rain. The following years, Hinton guest-starred in several television series such as Gilmore Girls, Everybody Hates Chris, Zoey 101, Ghost Whisperer, Gossip Girl, Lie to Me, Bones, and Scandal. In 2008 she did a Hanes commercial with Sarah Chalke. Other film credits include Broken Angel (2008) and The Roommate (2011), and well as Ion Television movie A Christmas Kiss (2011).

In September 2012, it was announced that Hinton had been cast as new intern Stephanie Edwards for ninth season of Shonda Rhimes medical drama series Grey's Anatomy.

In January 2013, it was announced that Hinton along with other newcomers to the show were given the option to become series regulars if Grey's Anatomy were to be renewed. After three seasons as regular cast member on show, Shonda Rhimes cast Hinton as the lead character of her first comedy pilot Toast in March 2016. She would still be on Grey's Anatomy if her pilot had gone to series. The pilot was not ordered to series. In January 2017, it was announced that Hinton will co-star opposite Holly Hunter in Here and Now, a HBO drama series created by Alan Ball. She portrayed Ashley Collins, one of the adopted children of Hunter's character. She next played Natalie Gorman in Servant (2019–2020) and began portraying Millie Morris in the Amazon Prime series Hunters in 2020.

Filmography

Film

Television

References

External links

Jerrika Hinton on Instagram
Jerrika Hinton on Twitter

1981 births
21st-century American actresses
Actresses from Dallas
Living people
Southern Methodist University alumni
African-American actresses
American television actresses
American film actresses
People from Oak Cliff, Texas
21st-century African-American women
21st-century African-American people
20th-century African-American people
20th-century African-American women